Love Story 2050 is a 2008 Indian Hindi-language science fiction-romance film starring producer Pammi Baweja and director Harry Baweja's son Harman Baweja and Priyanka Chopra. Some parts were filmed in Adelaide, Australia. Initially the film was supposed to release on 21 December 2007 but got postponed to 4 July 2008 due to extensive post-production work. The premiere was held on 2 July 2008 in London. The film draws a lot of similarity to the 1991 Telugu film Aditya 369; while the Telugu film dealt with travel to the past as well as dystopian post-apocalyptic future, Love Story 2050 was exclusively about travelling to a utopian future-city of Mumbai in the year 2050. It is the first utopian time travel film of Bollywood. The movie was released on 4 July 2008 and was a commercial and critical failure, with praise for its special effects, but criticism for its direction, screenplay and Harman Baweja's performance.

Plot
Karan Malhotra is a spirited and happy-go-lucky boy who does not follow the rules. Sana is the opposite of Karan: a sweet and shy girl who lives life by the rules. Even though they are completely opposite, they fall in love, leading to a magical love story.

A scientist, Dr. Yatinder Khanna, has dedicated 15 years of his life in building a time machine. Sana expresses a wish to time-travel to Mumbai in the year 2050, but she is killed in an accident before her marriage to Karan. Karan wishes to travel back in time and find Sana. Dr. Yatinder, Karan, and Sana's siblings, Rahul and Thea, travel forward in time and reach Mumbai in 2050. They are fascinated by the futuristic Mumbai, with its flying cars, holograms, robots, 200-story buildings and more.

Twists and turns lead to the introduction of Ziesha, the reincarnation of Sana. Ziesha is a popular singer in 2050 who does not remember her past life, but gets flashbacks of it after meeting Karan. Unlike Sana, Ziesha is an arrogant, headstrong and rebellious girl who does not believe in love. She leads a lonely life after the death of her parents, which has embittered her.

Karan and the others find themselves under the threat of the demi-god, Dr. Hoshi. After Karan tells Ziesha he loves her, he is taken away from her by the guards. Ziesha does not believe him when he tells her about his time travel. However, after reading Sana's diary, Ziesha ultimately remembers her past life. Karan returns to her and she declares her love for him and tells him she is Sana. Dr. Hoshi tries to capture Karan because he wants the time machine. After a wild attempt to catch Karan and Ziesha, Hoshi crashes into a nuclear substance truck and dies. Karan goes back to 2008 in the time machine with Ziesha and the rest of his family. Everyone is overjoyed to see their beloved Sana again and Karan proposes to her.

Cast 
 Harman Baweja as Karan Malhotra
 Priyanka Chopra as Sana Bedi/Zaisha
 Aman Batala as Rahul Bedi (Sana's younger brother)
 Archana Puran Singh as Mrs. Sangeeta Bedi (Sana's mum)
 Boman Irani as Professor Yatinder Khanna/Uncle Ya
 Shishir Sharma as Mr. Vishal Bedi (Sana's dad)
 Dalip Tahil as Mr Ravi Malhotra (Karan's dad)
 Kurush Deboo as Jimmy Dhinchuck (hacker)
 Harsh Vasishta as Karan's Friend
 Mehezabeen Sarela as Sheena
 Karan Mehra as Karan's Friend

Production
Initially, when Love Story 2050 was announced in 2004, Kareena Kapoor had signed on to play Priyanka's role, for which she was reportedly paid Rs. 30 million. Kapoor later opted out in 2006 saying she had some date problems and was replaced by Chopra. Love Story is Bollywood's first futuristic film and had 1200 special effect shots The budget – Rs. 600 million – was high for an Indian movie that time.

The special effects were executed by four international firms. Two special effects houses – Weta Workshop (New Zealand) and John Cox (Brisbane, Australia) – have won an Academy Award for their work on international projects.

Along with lead actors, Harman and Priyanka, a robot was seen playing a major role; viewers also get to see a teddy bear which appears to be more than a toy.

Lead actress Priyanka Chopra played a double role so she coloured her hair twice: once red to portray the girl from future and then again black. The red-haired look is inspired from Harman Baweja's sister Rowena Baweja's painting which portrays woman of today and tomorrow. The script of Love Story 2050 inspired her to do the painting.

The first trailer of the film was shown on 21 March 2008 at the premiere of Race.. Both lead promoted their film on the shahrukh khans's show kya aap paanchvi paas se tez hain.

Release
The film released on 4 July 2008 with 540 plus prints (including 200 digital screens) and approximately 200 prints overseas.

Reception
Taran Adarsh of Indiatimes called Harman the new flavour of the season and someone who will have a long stay in Bollywood..

Raja Sen of Rediff.com called the movie "absolutely ridiculous" with "nothing to offer". In reference to Harman Baweja, Sen said "He cannot act. He does not look good. He does not have screen presence".

It was a critical failure with many adding it on their worst movies lists as well as Priyanka and Harman's "worst film" lists.

Professor Shiju Sam Varughese, Coordinator of the Centre for Studies in Science, Technology and Innovation Policy at the Central University of Gujarat, did offer that the film's utopian version of Mumbai helps "understand the cultural anxieties about India’s neoliberal future".

 The film won the award for Best Special Effects at 54th Filmfare Awards.

Box office
The film failed to generate a big initial response and the bookings for the sci-fi release were tepid at best, garnering only about 25%–30% advance bookings. Another main reason for the failure of the movie is due to release of Jaane Tu Ya Jaane Na.

Love Story 2050 opened to a 25% response and, by noon shows, was in the 35%–40% range. In multiplexes, it opened to a 50%–60% response on Friday. The film was released on 725 cinemas including 350 digital cinemas.

The film crashed all around in week two, thus an average in India and overseas.

DVD and CD, telecast on television
Harry Baweja has plans to release the movie on DVD and has sold the DVD rights for a huge price. The DVD pack will include videos on the making of Love Story 2050 and its special effects.

PC game
Rocking Pixels in co-ordination with undisclosed USA-based firms is developing a game based on the film. The game was to be released sometime in June at an expected price point of around Rs 200; after the movie's failure, the release date of the game has been extended. This concept follows other Bollywood-based video games such as Dhoom 2 and Ghajini..

Soundtrack

The music was composed by Anu Malik. The lyrics were by Javed Akhtar. While the movie sank, the song "Milo Na Milo" was a monster hit among the young generation of India.

See also
 Science fiction film of India

References

External links
 

2008 films
2008 science fiction films
2000s romance films
Indian science fiction films
2000s Hindi-language films
Films about time travel
Films scored by Anu Malik
Films set in 2050
Films about reincarnation
Films directed by Harry Baweja
Films shot in Adelaide
Science fiction romance films